The Gufs is a studio album by the rock band The Gufs. It was released in 1996 on Atlantic Records. The album is the band's major record label debut, and mainly consists of songs first released on their 1995 album Collide.

Track listing
All tracks by The Gufs

"Smile" - 5:30
"Lost Along The Way" - 4:30
"Sunday Driver" - 3:52
"Crash (Into Me)" - 5:13
"Out Somehow" - 3:53
"Wasting Time" - 3:16
"Listen To The Trees" - 4:11
"Life's Sweet Sound" - 4:24
"Die Away From You" - 3:49
"Let Her Go" - 3:08
"Losers Love Song" - 2:32
"Fear Me Now" - 4:28
"So Easily" - 4:50

Personnel 

 Goran Kralj - lead vocals
 Dejan Kralj - bass guitar
 Morgan Dawley - lead guitar, backup vocals
 Scott Schwebel - drums

See also
The Gufs

External links
The Gufs Official Website

Notes

1990 debut albums
The Gufs albums